Mondo Cane #2 is an album by jazz trombonist and arranger Kai Winding featuring guitarist Les Spann recorded in late 1963 and early 1964 for the Verve label. The album was released following the chart success of Winding's version of the "More (Theme from Mondo Cane)" from the album Soul Surfin' (reissued as !!!More!!! (Theme from Mondo Cane)).

Reception

The Allmusic review by Tony Wilds observed "Mondo Cane, No. 2 complements its best-selling predecessor by shifting from surf to soil. The Ondioline takes center stage driving the melody... Is the sequel better than the original? Yes, if you prefer originality in composition and arrangement as well as plenty of Ondioline. No, if you want surf, standards, and Kenny Burrell".

Track listing
 "Mondo Cane #2" (Nino Oliviero) - 1:52
 "Simian Theme" (Kai Winding) - 1:48
 "Till (Triere Sans Espoir)" (Charles Danvers, Carl Sigman) - 2:05
 "Python" (Claus Ogerman) - 1:58
 "The Moldau" (Bedřich Smetana) - 2:19
 "Now and Forever" (Al Kasha, Bob Gaudio) - 2:21
 "Portrait of My Love" (David West, Cyril Ornadel) - 1:57
 "Warm" (Sid Jacobson, Jimmy Krondes) - 2:03
 "The Gospel Truth" (Kasha, Gaudio) - 2:20
 "Theme from "Nowhere"" (Winding) - 1:55
 "Theme from "The Medic" (Blue Star)" (Victor Young, Edward Heyman) - 2:13
 "The Struggle" (Ogerman) - 2:03

Personnel 
Kai Winding - trombone, arranger
Les Spann - guitar
Jean Jacques Perrey - ondioline
Unidentified band 
Billy Byers (track 8), Charles Calello (tracks 5 & 6), Claus Ogerman (tracks 1, 4, 7, 9 & 12) - arranger

References 

1964 albums
Kai Winding albums
Albums produced by Creed Taylor
Albums arranged by Claus Ogerman
Albums arranged by Charles Calello
Verve Records albums